The Oyo State Executive Council (informally, the Cabinet of Oyo State) is the highest formal governmental body that plays important roles in the Oyo State Government headed by the Governor of Oyo State. It consists of the Deputy Governor, Secretary to the State Government, Chief of Staff, Commissioners who preside over ministerial departments, and the Governor's special aides.

Functions
The Executive Council exists to advise and direct the Governor. Their appointment as members of the Executive Council gives them the authority to execute power over their fields.

Current cabinet
The current Executive Council is serving under the Engineer Seyi Makinde administration. He was elected as governor of Oyo State at the gubernatorial election of 9 March 2019. He was sworn-in as the 18th Governor of Oyo State on 29 May 2019.

Special Advisers

Senior Special Assistants

References

Oyo
Oyo State
Government of Oyo State